
Uncial 0152 (in the Gregory-Aland numbering), is a Greek talisman manuscript of the New Testament. It contains a small fragment of the Gospel of Matthew (16:9-13). It is dated to the 4th century.

Description 

The text is written in 8 lines and 18 letters per line.

Caspar René Gregory classified manuscripts of New Testament into four groups: Papyri, Uncials, Minuscules, and Lectionaries. Talisman included into Uncials, it received number 0152. Eberhard Nestle distinguished new group – Talismans, and to this group included Uncial 0152. It received no. 1. This opinion was supported by other scholars, f.e. Kurt Aland, and in result Uncial 0152 (or Talisman 1) was deleted from the list of New Testament uncials, and now we have empty place in position 152 of the list.

See also 
 List of New Testament uncials
 Textual criticism
 Uncial 0153

References

Further reading 
 Nestle, Eberhard (1923). Einführung in das griechische Neue Testament, 4th edn, revised by Ernst von Dobschütz (Göttingen), p. 86. 
 Clark, K. W. (1937). A Descriptive Catalogue of Greek New Testament Manuscript in America, (Chicago). pp. 139, 226-227.
 Vaganay Léon (1991). An Introduction to New Testament Textual Criticism. Cambridge University Press. . pp. 26.

Uncial 0152
Talismans